William Pattison Telford (26 November 1867 – 13 March 1955) was a Liberal party member of the House of Commons of Canada. He was born in Sydenham, Ontario and became a lawyer. His father was William Pattison Telford Sr., another member of Parliament.

From 1901 to 1903, Telford served as a municipal councillor for Owen Sound.

He was first elected to Parliament at the Grey North riding in the 1926 general election after an earlier unsuccessful campaign there in 1921. He was defeated by Victor Clarence Porteous of the Conservatives in the 1930 election. Telford won the riding back from Porteous in the 1935 election, and was elected again in 1940. Telford resigned on 9 December 1944 to provide an available riding for fellow Liberal Andrew McNaughton to seek election, but McNaughton lost the resulting by-election to Conservative candidate W. Garfield Case.

External links
 

1867 births
1955 deaths
Lawyers in Ontario
Liberal Party of Canada MPs
Members of the House of Commons of Canada from Ontario